Andrea Hlaváčková and Lucie Hradecká were the defending champions but chose not to compete.

Melinda Czink and Mirjana Lučić-Baroni won the title, defeating Maria Fernanda Alves and Samantha Murray in the final, 5–7, 6–4, [10–7].

Seeds

Draw

External Links
 Draw
 Draw (pdf)

Dow Corning Tennis Classic - Doubles
Dow Corning Tennis Classic